Kendujhar (Sadar) is an administrative unit in Kendujhar district in the state of Odisha, India. This subdivision consists of the town Keundujhar which is the administrative headquarters of the eponymous district.

Administrative Divisions
Kendujhar Sadar subdivision is the largest of the three subdivisions of Kendujhar District (the other two being Anandapur and Champua). It consists of seven blocks of 160 Gram Panchayats. The blocks are listed as following.

 Sadar 	
 Ghatagaon
 Harichandanpur 
 Telkoi 
 Banspal 
 Patna 
 Saharpada

Geography
It has an average elevation of 456 metres .

Demographics
Kendujhar Subdivision has a population of 871,927 according to Census India 2011.

Languages
The major language of the area is Odia. However Hindi & English are also significantly understood.

Politics

Kendujhar Sadar is part of Keonjhar (Lok Sabha constituency).

The following are the three Vidhan sabha constituencies of Kendujhar district and the elected members of that area.

References

Cities and towns in Kendujhar district